Mojica may refer to:

Francisco Juan Martínez Mojica (born 1963), Spanish microbiologist at the University of Alicante, Spain
Gualberto Mojica (born 1984), Bolivian footballer
Johan Mojica (born 1992), Colombian professional footballer who plays for Spanish club Girona FC
José Adolfo Mojica Morales (1936–2012), the Roman Catholic bishop of Sonsonate, El Salvador
Jose Manuel Mojica Legarre (born 1955), Spanish writer
José Mojica Marins (born 1936), Brazilian filmmaker, actor, screenwriter, TV and media personality
José Mojica (1896–1974), Mexican Franciscan friar and former tenor and film actor
Melissa Mojica (born 1983), judoka from Puerto Rico
Monique Mojica, Canadian playwright, director, and actor
Vilmarie Mojica (born 1985), female volleyball player from Puerto Rico
Vinia Mojica, singer from Queens, New York